Gledhow Hall is an English country house in Gledhow, Leeds, West Yorkshire. A house, built in the 17th-century by John Thwaites, was remodelled for a new owner by the Yorkshire architect John Carr. It is a Grade II* listed building and has been converted into flats.

History

Gledhow Hall is built on what was monastic land, the property of Kirkstall Abbey. The abbey was the major landowner in the Allerton area in the 13th century. The abbey lands were seized by the Crown in 1539 at the Dissolution of the Monasteries. John Thwaites bought the land and built a house in the 17th-century. It was remodelled between 1764 and 1767 by John Carr for Jeremiah Dixon, who was by then the owner.

J. M. W. Turner painted a watercolour view of the hall in about 1816, staying at the house while he made preparatory sketches.

By 1885, James Kitson, 1st Baron Airedale, industrial magnate, founder of the Kitson Airedale locomotive foundries and notable figure in the Liberal party, had purchased the hall and was living there. Between 1885 and 1890, the hall was altered and extended by architects, Chorley and Connon.

Albert Kitson, 2nd Baron Airedale succeeded to the title and the estate on his father's death in 1911. The Kitsons entertained several Liberal Prime Ministers and their families at Gledhow: William Gladstone and his son, H. H. Asquith and his wife in 1913, and in 1920, Margaret Lloyd George when she was in Leeds for a reception of women supporters of the wartime coalition.

Description
 
The two-storey house is built in stone ashlar, with chamfered quoins, cornices, a balustraded parapet, and a hipped roof in slate and lead with a tall chimney stack. The south front has two two-storey canted bay windows with three sash windows between them. The centrally-placed doorway has a Gibbs surround, a fanlight and a pediment and is accessed by stone steps. The extension by Chorley and Connon at the rear has three bays, two pairs of Ionic columns forming a loggia, and a porch in the corner with Tuscan columns, over which is an oriel window.

The main entrance through the rear loggia has paired panelled doors glazed in stained glass with fruit and butterfly motifs. The entrance hall has mosaic floor and has been partition for flats. The stone cantilevered staircase has a wrought-iron scrolled balustrade and a mahogany handrail. The top-lit stair well retains eight lunette windows, each with stained glass representing foliage, flowers and fruit. On the first floor is the tiled bathroom from 1885. The elaborate faience (glazed architectural terra-cotta) bathroom in Burmantofts Pottery was created for a visit from the Prince of Wales. The bathroom has panelled mahogany doors and a bolection moulded fireplace. The walls are covered with moulded tiles in brown, blue and white, with a dado, moulded rail, scrolled frieze and a dentilled cornice. The ceiling is tiled in a strapwork design and has three diamond-shaped vents. The adjacent toilet is similarly decorated.

VAD hospital

After the outbreak of the First World War, Lord Airedale offered the hall for use as a Voluntary Aid Detachment (VAD) hospital. Run by the British Red Cross, it was staffed by both professional and VAD nurses.
The hospital opened in 1915 and his cousin Edith Cliff was its commandant (officer in charge) throughout the war. She kept a scrapbook, The Great European War, Gledhow Hall Hospital, documenting life there between 1915 and 1919.

The scrapbook, filled with "photographs, newscuttings, letters and ephemera" is held by Leeds Libraries as one of its most important treasures The scrapbook was chosen for the UK-wide Digital War Memorial, hosted by Historypin, a user-generated archive in 2014. Community groups from local libraries, guided by an artist, worked to "find the voice" of the scrapbook and explore themes around it, visited and photographed Gledhow Hall including its faience bathroom.

See also
Grade II* listed buildings in West Yorkshire
Listed buildings in Leeds (Roundhay Ward)

References

Listed buildings in Leeds
Grade II* listed buildings in West Yorkshire
Grade II* listed houses
Country houses in West Yorkshire
Leeds Blue Plaques